The  omasum, also known as the bible, the fardel, the manyplies and the psalterium, is the third compartment of the stomach in ruminants. The omasum comes after the rumen and reticulum and before the abomasum. Different ruminants have different omasum structures and function based on the food that they eat and how they developed through evolution.

Anatomy 
The omasum can be found on the right side of the cranial portion of the rumen. The omasum receives food from the reticulum through the reticulo-omasal orifice and provides food to the abomasum through the omaso-abomasal orifice.  The omasum is spherical to crescent shape and has multiple leaflets similar to that of a book called omasal laminae.  The omasal laminae are made of thin muscular layers covered with a nonglandular mucous membrane. The omasal laminae come from the sides of the large curvature and project towards the inside of the omasum, extending from the reticulo-omasal orifice to the omaso-abomasal orifice. The laminae greatly increase the surface area of the omasum. The laminae are covered in omasal papillae that are claw-like in some ruminants or blunt cones in others. These papillae further increase the surface area but they also provide increased friction against the food particles.

Function 
The function of the omasum is not completely understood. During the second contraction phase of the reticulum,  the reticule-omasal sphincter opens for a few seconds allowing a small volume of finely dispersed and well-fermented ingesta to enter the omasum.

The omasum has two physiological compartments: omasal canal that transfers food from the reticulum to the omasum, and the inter-laminate recesses between the mucosal laminae which provide the area for absorption. The omasum is where food particles that are small enough get transferred into the abomasum for enzymatic digestion. In ruminants with a more sophisticated omasum, the large surface area allows it to play a key role in the absorption of water, electrolytes, volatile fatty acids, minerals, and the fermentation of food.

Young ruminants that are still drinking milk have an esophageal groove that allows milk to bypass the rumen and go straight from the esophagus to the omasum.

Species differences 
An early version of the omasum is seen in early ruminants like duikers and muntjacs, where it is a little more than a strainer sieve which prevents un-chewed foods from entering the abomasum.

The smallest omasum belongs to ruminants that consume high quality diets like the moose and roe deer, while the largest belongs to those who are un-selective grass and roughage eaters like cattle and sheep.

The omasum is not only bigger in grass and roughage eaters but there is greater differentiation in the book-like structure; seen as an increase in the number of laminae.

Culinary uses

See also 
Omasitis
Methanogens in digestive tract of ruminants

References 

Mammal anatomy
Digestive system
Ruminants